James P. Ritter (October 30, 1930 – May 4, 2015) was an American design draftsman and politician.

James P. Ritter was born October 30, 1930 in Allentown, Pennsylvania. He graduated from Allentown High School and served in the U.S. Army during the Korean War. Ritter took courses in mechanical engineering and was a design draftsman for PPL Corporation and Lehigh Structural Steel in Allentown.

Ritter served in the Pennsylvania House of Representatives from 1965 until 1983 and was a Democrat. Ritter died in Allentown, Pennsylvania on May 4, 2015.

References

Democratic Party members of the Pennsylvania House of Representatives
2015 deaths
1930 births
Politicians from Allentown, Pennsylvania